Puber Kalom is an Indian Bengali language daily newspaper published in Kolkata, West Bengal.  Its editor is Ahmed Hassan Imran who is a former member of Rajya Sabha from West Bengal.

History
Kalom was launched as a monthly magazine in 1981. It became a weekly in 1983. The Saradha Group bought it in 2011 and turned it into a daily newspaper with a circulation of up to 40,000.

In 2013 after the Saradha Group financial scandal it was again bought by Kalom Welfare Association.

References

1981 establishments in West Bengal
Newspapers published in Kolkata
[[Category:Bengali-language newspapers publ